General elections were scheduled to be held in Haiti on 7 November 2021 to elect the president and Parliament, alongside a constitutional referendum. However, in September 2021 they were postponed following the dismissal of the members of the Provisional Electoral Council by acting Prime Minister Ariel Henry.

The parliamentary elections had originally been scheduled for 27 October 2019, but were postponed to 26 September 2021. The elections were then postponed again to 7 November 2021. Prime Minister Henry later stated that he hoped to hold the elections in early 2022. On 8 February 2022, he called for renewed efforts to organize elections. In December, he signed an agreement to hold the elections in 2023.

Background

Mass street demonstrations and violent protest marches began across Haiti on 14 January in protest at Moïse's plan to run for one more year in power. Since the 14 January protest, hundreds of thousands have taken part in weekly protests calling for the government to resign. Moïse was assassinated on 7 July 2021.

On 8 July, interim prime minister Claude Joseph's office announced that despite the assassination, the parliamentary elections would still be held on the date set by the Provisional Electoral Council and that members of the opposition would be included in election timetable talks, stating that "The Head of Government promises to hold talks with opposition leaders and other actors in national life to calm the socio-political climate and facilitate inclusive and credible elections according to the timetable set by the Provisional Electoral Council." The United Nations special envoy for Haiti, Helen La Lime, said that interim Prime Minister Claude Joseph would lead Haiti until elections were held later in the year, urging all parties to set aside differences following the assassination of President Jovenel Moïse. Ariel Henry was appointed as Prime Minister later that month.

Henry dismissed all members of the Provisional Electoral Council, seen by many in the country as politically biased, on 27 September 2021. He stated that a new council would be appointed which would hold the elections in early 2022. On 11 September 2022, he stated that the government would begin the organization of elections by the end of 2022.

On 21 December 2022 Henry signed an agreement with political parties, civil society organizations and private sector members to hold the elections in 2023, with the new government scheduled to be sworn in on 7 February 2024.

Electoral system
The President of Haiti is elected using the two-round system, with a second round held if no candidate wins a majority of the vote in the first round.

The 119 members of the Chamber of Deputies are elected in single-member constituencies for four-year terms using a modified two-round system; a candidate must receive either over 50% of the vote, or have a lead over the second-placed candidate equivalent to 25% of the valid votes in order to be elected in the first round; if no candidate meets this requirement, a second round is held, in which the candidate with the most votes wins.

One third of the 30-member Senate is elected every two years. The members are elected from ten single-member constituencies based on the departments, also using the two-round system.

References

Haiti
Elections in Haiti
Presidential elections in Haiti